Head Over Heels is an action-adventure video game released by Ocean Software in 1987 for several 8-bit home computers. It uses an isometric engine that is similar to the Filmation technique first developed by Ultimate Play the Game.

Head Over Heels is the second isometric game by Jon Ritman and Bernie Drummond, after their earlier Batman computer game was released in 1986. The game received very favourable reviews and was described as an all time classic.

In 2003, Retrospec released a remake of Head Over Heels for Microsoft Windows, Mac OS X, BeOS, and Linux. In 2019, Piko Interactive released an Atari ST port of Head Over Heels for Atari Jaguar. A Nintendo Switch port was released on October 28, 2021.

Gameplay

The player controls two characters instead of just one, each with different abilities.

Head can jump higher than Heels, control himself in the air, and fire doughnuts from a hooter to paralyze enemies.

Heels can run twice as fast as Head, climb certain staircases that Head cannot, and carry objects around a room in a bag.

These abilities become complementary when the player combines them after completing roughly a sixth of the game. Compared to its predecessors, the game offers unique and revolutionary gameplay, complex puzzles, and more than 300 rooms to explore.

Drummond contributed some famously surreal touches, including robots (controlled by push switches) that bore a remarkable resemblance to the head of Charles III (then Prince of Wales) on the body of a Dalek. Other surreal touches include enemies with the heads of elephants and staircases made of dogs that teleport themselves away as soon as Head enters the room.

Plot
Headus Mouthion (Head) and Footus Underium (Heels) are two spies from the planet Freedom. They are sent to Blacktooth to liberate the enslaved planets of Penitentiary, Safari, Book World and Egyptus, and then to defeat the Emperor to prevent further planets from falling under his rule.

Captured and separated, the spies are placed in the prison headquarters of Castle Blacktooth. They must first escape, then break through the market to the orbiting Moonbase. From there they can teleport down to each planet and locate and reclaim the stolen crowns. Liberating the planets and defeating the Emperor will allow Head and Heels to return to Freedom as heroes.

Development 
Jon Ritman re-used and modified the isometric engine he created for Batman to support the control of 2 players instead of just 1. Modifications were made to the code for the C64 version to lower processor load, but in the end there was very little difference between the versions.

Reception

Your Sinclair awarded Head over Heels 9/10 in the June 1987 issue and the game was placed at number 5 in the Your Sinclair official top 100. Sinclair User also awarded 9/10. It was chosen by Your Sinclair editors and readers as the ZX Spectrum's 1987 Game of the Year.

Crash magazine gave Head over Heels 97% and called the game "The best fun you are likely to have with a Spectrum for quite some time".

Zzap!64 gave the Commodore 64 conversion of the game 98%: enough for its coveted Gold Medal Award; the joint highest score in the magazine's history; and the first Gold Medal of the year - in its August 1987 issue. It was described as "An all time classic - not to be missed for any reason".

References

External links
Head over Heels at MobyGames

Head over Heels at Hall of Light
Analysis of Head over Heels at gamestudies.org

1987 video games
Action-adventure games
Amiga games
Amstrad CPC games
Amstrad PCW games
Atari 8-bit family games
Atari Jaguar games
Atari ST games
Commodore 64 games
MSX games
Ocean Software games
Piko Interactive games
Video games set in castles
Video games set on fictional planets
Video games with isometric graphics
ZX Spectrum games
Video games developed in the United Kingdom